is a Japanese voice actress. She has voiced in many popular anime series, such as MÄR and To Heart 2.

Roles
Asobi ni iku yo! as Maya
Bleach as Franceska Mila Rose, Kyōko Haida
D.C. ~Da Capo~ as Sa-chin
Danball Senki Wars as Hikaru Hoshihara
Futari wa Precure Splash Star as Ayano Takeuchi
Magical Kanan as Miyuri Suzuhara
MÄR as Ginta's mother; Reginleif Princess
Mekakucity Actors as Young Kousuke Seto
Mermaid Melody: Pichi Pichi Pitch as Izul
Ouran High School Host Club as Hitachiin's Helper; Ruri Karasuma
Soul Eater Monotone Princess (video game) as Ponera
Sekirei as Shiina, Chiho
To Heart 2 as Sango Himeyuri
Windy Tales as Miasa
Wings of Rean as Sere
Asura Cryin' as Susugihara Yo
Sono Kuchibiru ni Yoru no Tsuyu Drama CD as Bus Announcer
Bleach: Thousand-Year Blood War as Franceska Mila Rose

External links
 Sayori Ishizuka at Arts Vision 
 

1977 births
Living people
Voice actresses from Shizuoka Prefecture
Japanese voice actresses
21st-century Japanese actresses
Arts Vision voice actors